The Ukrainian Woman Footballer of the Year is an annual award given by the Ukrainian Women's League to the best professional Ukrainian female footballer since 2008. There are two awards available and the other is called Best Footballer of the Ukrainian Woman League.

Best Ukrainian Female Footballer

Ukrainian Women's League

See also

 List of sports awards honoring women
Soviet Footballer of the Year

References

External links

Ukrainian football trophies and awards
Women's association football player of the year awards
Awards established in 2008
2008 establishments in Ukraine